The Gwune language, also known as Agwagwune, is an Upper Cross River language of Nigeria spoken by the Akunakuna people. It is a dialect cluster named after its prestige variety; others are Abayongo, Abini, Dim (Adim), Orum, Erei, Etono.

References

Languages of Nigeria
Upper Cross River languages